Ōshima, Oshima, Ooshima or Ohshima (written: 大島, 大嶋 lit. "big island") is a Japanese surname. Notable people with the surname include:

, Japanese sprint canoeist
Hiromi Oshima, model and playmate
Hiroshi Ōshima, Japanese ambassador to Nazi Germany during World War II
Joun Ōshima, noted Japanese sculptor in the Meiji/Taisho era
Mai Oshima, AKB48
Masamitsu Ōshima (1884–1965), Japanese herpetologist and ichthyologist
Masumi Oshima, Japanese writer
Michiru Oshima, Japanese composer
Nagisa Oshima, Japanese film director
Naoto Ohshima, original character designer of Sonic the Hedgehog and Dr. Robotnik
, Japanese footballer
Takanori Ōshima, Japanese sumo coach at Tomozuna stable
Takatō Ōshima, made the first blast furnace and western-style cannons in Japan
Towa Oshima, manga artist
, Japanese footballer
Tsutomu Ohshima, martial artist, head of Shotokan Karate of America
Yasunori Oshima, Japanese baseball player and manager
Yuko Oshima, AKB48

Fictional characters
, a character in the manga series Urara Meirocho

Japanese-language surnames